Officer Pooch is a 1941 animated short film produced by Fred Quimby, directed by William Hanna and Joseph Barbera and distributed by Metro-Goldwyn-Mayer. The cartoon is mostly done in pantomime.

Plot
A canine officer (modeled after the Keystone Cops) is called out to rescue a kitten, harassed by an aggressive terrier. He continues to tangle with the situation, then finds a basket full of kittens. He carries the basket into an alley where he runs into a whole pack of dogs. They chase him and the kittens up a tree, stranding them.

Availability
The cartoon is available on the "Droopy and Company" videotape. It is also included as an extra on the DVD of the feature film The Big Store.

External links

1941 films
1941 animated films
1941 short films
1940s American animated films
1940s animated short films
Short films directed by Joseph Barbera
Short films directed by William Hanna
Metro-Goldwyn-Mayer animated short films
1940s police comedy films
Animated films about cats
Animated films about dogs
Films scored by Scott Bradley
Films produced by Fred Quimby